Jarvis Lord (February 10, 1816 in Ballston, Saratoga County, New York – July 24, 1887 in Pittsford, Monroe County, New York), was an American politician from New York.

Life
He was the son of Daniel Lord (1780–1818) and Clarissa (Seeley) Lord (1783–1867). He attended the common schools, and became a farmer. He married Eliza Ann Decker (1819–1854), and they had three children, among them Assemblyman George D. Lord. About 1842, he removed to a farm in Pittsford. He also became a contractor, engaging in canal construction, and was president of the Bank of Monroe of Rochester. On March 20, 1855, he married Zilpha M. Tibbets (1835–1911).

He was a member of the New York State Assembly (Monroe Co., 1st D.) in 1858. At the state elections in 1861 and 1864, he ran on the Democratic ticket for Canal Commissioner, but was defeated both times by Republican Franklin A. Alberger.

In 1872, Lord had a lake freighter named after him.

He was again a member of the State Assembly in 1867, and was the Democratic minority's candidate for Speaker. He was a member of the New York State Senate (28th D.) from 1870 to 1875, sitting in the 93rd, 94th, 95th, 96th, 97th and 98th New York State Legislatures. In 1876–77, he was accused in connection with the Canal Ring frauds, and became a defendant in a series of trials.

He was buried at the Pittsford Cemetery.

Sources
 The New York Civil List compiled by Franklin Benjamin Hough, Stephen C. Hutchins and Edgar Albert Werner (1870; pg. 444, 487 and 506)
 Life Sketches of Executive Officers, and Members of the Legislature of the State of New York, Vol. III by H. H. Boone & Theodore P. Cook (1870; pg. 96f)
 Lord genealogy at RootsWeb
 WAR ON THE CANAL RING in NYT on March 26, 1875
 THE TRIAL OF JARVIS LORD in NYT on December 6, 1876

External links

1816 births
1887 deaths
Democratic Party New York (state) state senators
People from Ballston, New York
People from Pittsford, New York
Democratic Party members of the New York State Assembly
19th-century American politicians